Studia Islamica is an academic journal of Islamic studies focusing on the history, religion, law, literature, and language of the Muslim world, primarily Southwest Asian and Mediterranean lands. The editors-in-chief are A. L. Udovitch (Princeton University) and Houari Touati (School for Advanced Studies in the Social Sciences). It was established in 1953 and is published biannually. Brill has published the journal since 2013.

External links 
 

Publications established in 1953
Islamic studies journals
Multilingual journals
Biannual journals
Brill Publishers academic journals